was a Japanese samurai warrior and daimyō of the late Sengoku and early Edo periods. He was the son of Akizuki Tanezane.

In 1586, Tanenaga joined with his father to fight against Toyotomi Hideyoshi forces during the Kyūshū campaign

In 1598, Tanenaga made contributions at the Siege of Ulsan castle against the allied Chinese and Korean armies. During the Korean campaign, Tanenaga served under Kuroda Nagamasa.

In 1600, in the Battle of Sekigahara, Tanenaga defended Ōgaki Castle on behalf of the "Western Army". However, soon after the Western Army suffered defeat, Mizuno Katsunari convinced Tanenaga to switch allegiance to the Eastern Army. Tokugawa Ieyasu rewarded Tanenaga by recognizing his territory and enabling him to become the first head of Takanabe Domain in Hyūga Province on the island of Kyushu.

Tanenaga did not have a son so he adopted, Akizuki Taneharu, the son of Tanesada (son in law) and Ochō (Tanenaga’s daughter), was appointed as Tanenaga’s successor. Tanenaga died in 1614 and Taneharu inherited the clan.

References

External links
Genealogy of the Akizuki of Takanabe (in Japanese)

1567 births
1614 deaths
Daimyo
Samurai